Warm Fuzz Records is a British independent record label focussing on alternative rock founded by producer Ian Shaw.

Artists released on Warm Fuzz 
Kelly's Heels
Virginia (featuring Alison Wheeler)
Matt Backer 
The Ashes
Trouble Dolls
Sebastopol
Bill Blue

See also 
 List of record labels

References

Alternative rock record labels
British independent record labels
Record labels established in 2006